Nery Alberto Pumpido (born 30 July 1957) is an Argentine football coach and former goalkeeper who played for Argentina in two World Cups. After retirement, Pumpido moved into club management. His nephew Facundo Pumpido is also a professional footballer.

Club career
Pumpido began his career at his home city side Unión de Santa Fe. After a brief stint for Vélez Sársfield, where his form saw him called up for the 1982 FIFA World Cup squad, he moved to Club Atlético River Plate to replace the departing national 'keeper Ubaldo Fillol. Here, he became part of the side that won the Argentine Primera División as well as the Copa Libertadores for the first time in its history in 1986 under manager Héctor Veira. In 1988, he transferred to Spanish club Real Betis where, in 1989, he almost lost a finger during a training session when his wedding ring caught on a nail in the crossbar of the goal. He returned to Argentina to his first club, Union in 1991. 
His last season was at the Lanus Athletic Club in 1993, and then he retired from football.

International career

Although chosen by Argentina national team coach César Luis Menotti as the third goalkeeper of the Argentina national team in the 1982 World Cup, he did not play in the tournament. Pumpido eventually made his international debut against Paraguay the following year. He was the starting goalkeeper during Argentina's victorious 1986 World Cup campaign, playing in all seven games, conceding just five goals in 630 minutes of football, and keeping three clean sheets.

At the 1990 World Cup, Pumpido was at fault for Cameroon's winning goal, fumbling François Omam-Biyik's header into the net as the African nation shocked the defending champions at the tournament's opening game in Milan, winning by a goal to nil. Pumpido then broke his leg in the eleventh minute of Argentina's second game against the USSR. He was replaced by substitute Sergio Goycochea (also his understudy at River Plate), who had not played a game in eight months. Goycochea eventually became key to Argentina's run to the final, saving penalty shoot-out kicks in the quarter final win over Yugoslavia and the semi-final victory over hosts Italy.

Coaching career

After retiring as a player, Pumpido went into management. After several seasons at Unión de Santa Fe he took over at Paraguayan side Olimpia, from the capital city of Asunción, winning the Copa Libertadores in 2002. After resigning from Olimpia due to a lack of "[...] support from the president", he then became coach of UANL Tigres in Mexico, reaching the final of the 2003–04 Primera División de México championship. Between October 2005 and July 2006, Pumpido coached Argentinian Primera División club Newell's Old Boys, followed by brief stints at Mexican club side CD Veracruz and Saudi club Al-Shabab, before his return to Olimpia, Paraguay's most successful football club and winner of three Libertadores cups, as well as one Intercontinental cup. On 23 December 2011, he was hired as coach of the Argentinian club Godoy Cruz. On 3 September 2012, he returned to Unión de Santa Fe for a second spell as manager.

Honours

Player
Unión Santa Fe
 Liga Santafesina de Fútbol: 1979

River Plate
 Primera División: 1985–86
 Intercontinental Cup: 1986 
 Copa Libertadores: 1986
 Copa Interamericana: 1986

Real Betis
 Segunda División runner-up: 1989–90

Argentina
 FIFA World Cup: 1986

Manager
Unión Santa Fe
 Liga Santafesina de Fútbol: Apertura 2000

Olimpia
 Copa Libertadores: 2002

References

External links

Nery Pumpido – Managerial stats in the Argentine Primera at Fútbol XXI  
 

1957 births
Living people
Footballers from Santa Fe, Argentina
Association football goalkeepers
Argentine people of Spanish descent
Argentine footballers
Club Atlético River Plate footballers
Real Betis players
Unión de Santa Fe footballers
Club Atlético Vélez Sarsfield footballers
La Liga players
Club Olimpia managers
Copa Libertadores-winning players
FIFA World Cup-winning players
1982 FIFA World Cup players
1986 FIFA World Cup players
1990 FIFA World Cup players
1983 Copa América players
1989 Copa América players
Argentina international footballers
Argentine football managers
Unión de Santa Fe managers
Newell's Old Boys managers
Argentine Primera División players
Argentine expatriate footballers
Argentine expatriate sportspeople in Spain
Godoy Cruz Antonio Tomba managers
C.D. Veracruz managers
Al Shabab FC (Riyadh) managers
Saudi Professional League managers
Expatriate football managers in Saudi Arabia
Argentine expatriate sportspeople in Paraguay
Expatriate football managers in Paraguay
Argentine expatriate sportspeople in Saudi Arabia